Kim Yeu-jin, better known as Reignover, is a South Korean League of Legends coach and former professional player. He played for Fnatic of the EU LCS during most of the 2015 season as their jungler. While on Fnatic, he won 2 EU LCS championships and placed third at the 2015 World Championship. After leaving Fnatic, he played for Immortals of the NA LCS in 2016 season, Team Liquid in 2017, and Counter Logic Gaming in 2018.

Reignover was named MVP of the 2016 NA LCS Spring Split while he was a member of Immortals.

In 2019, he joined Cloud9 as a coach. In 2020, he was promoted to head coach of Cloud9. He stepped down as head coach before the start of the 2021 LCS Summer Split and formally left the organization at the end of the season. He joined MAD Lions at the beginning of 2022 as a positional coach.

Tournament results

Fnatic 
 1st — 2015 EU LCS Spring
 3rd–4th — 2015 Mid-Season Invitational
 1st — 2015 EU LCS Summer
 3rd–4th — 2015 League of Legends World Championship

Immortals 
 3rd — 2016 Spring NA LCS
 3rd — 2016 Summer NA LCS

References 

1995 births
Living people
League of Legends coaches
League of Legends jungle players
South Korean esports players
Counter Logic Gaming players
Fnatic players
Immortals (esports) players
Team Liquid players
Place of birth missing (living people)